Mika Lahtinen (born 30 April 1985) is a Finnish former footballer. During his career he played for RoPS, JJK and Tampere United in the Veikkausliiga, and for PP-70 and FC Hämeenlinna in the Ykkönen.

References

External links
Profile at Guardian Football
Profile at RoPS 
Profile at Veikkausliiga's website 

1985 births
Living people
Footballers from Tampere
Finnish footballers
Veikkausliiga players
Rovaniemen Palloseura players
JJK Jyväskylä players
Tampere United players
FC Ilves players
Association football forwards